Lale (or Laleköy, literally “tulip village” in Turkish) is a village in Anamur district of Mersin Province, Turkey. It is situated in the Taurus Mountains. It is one of the westernmost locations of Mersin Province. The population of Lale was 348  as of 2012.

References

Villages in Anamur District